IgA protease may refer to:
 IgA specific serine endopeptidase, an enzyme
 IgA-specific metalloendopeptidase, an enzyme